Dan Sperry is an American magician and illusionist. He lives in New York City and Las Vegas.

Career 
By the time he was 17, Dan Sperry was one of the youngest illusionists to headline the Magic Castle in Hollywood and shortly afterwards, the youngest illusionist featured in several shows on the Las Vegas strip. He also appeared multiple times on the television series Masters of Illusion.

Shows and prizes
 International Brotherhood of Magicians – 3-time winner of "Award of Merit"
 The World's Greatest Magic – for 5 years in Las Vegas; youngest illusionist
 America's Got Talent (2010) – semifinalist
 Masters of Illusion
 Das Supertalent (2012) – finished third place
 What Now – guest star – May 2013
Penn & Teller: Fool Us – August 17, 2017
 La France a un incroyable talent (season 13) – semifinalist
Cake Boss – special guest
America's Got Talent – special guest
The Illusionists touring production – breakout star 2012–2017
The Magic Castle – regular headliner

References

External links
 Official website

Living people
American magicians
Year of birth missing (living people)
America's Got Talent contestants